Fairvue may refer to:

Isaac Franklin Plantation, also known as Fairvue, a former National Historic Landmark that remains listed on the NRHP in Gallatin, Sumner County, Tennessee
Fairvue (Jefferson City, Tennessee), listed on the National Register of Historic Places in Jefferson County, Tennessee